Abdelmalek Merabet (born 7 December 2000) is an Algerian Greco-Roman wrestler. He competed for Algeria at the 2020 Summer Olympics in the men's Greco-Roman 67 kg event.

References

External links
 

2000 births
Living people
Wrestlers at the 2020 Summer Olympics
Algerian male sport wrestlers
Olympic wrestlers of Algeria
Competitors at the 2019 African Games
African Games competitors for Algeria
21st-century Algerian people